Yehuda Melamed (b. 17 Feb 1943, Rehovot) is an Israeli physician specialized in the fields of diving medicine and hyperbaric medicine. He is the founder of the first hyperbaric medical centers in the Israeli Navy, Rambam Medical Center and Elisha Medical Center in Haifa, the hyperbaric medical center in Asaf Harofe Hospital in Tzrifin, and together with Dr Hertz, the recompression chamber in Yoseftal Medical center.

Career 
Melamed is a member and official physician of the Underwater Exploration Society of Israel, responsible for safety and the prevention of diving accidents. The initial treatment of diving injuries in Sinai, from 1974 to 1982, which he instituted and supervised, entailed evacuation of the casualty in a transportable recompression rescue chamber to the large multiplace Navy hyperbaric chamber in Haifa, and later in Eilat.

After Yom Kippur War in 1973, Melamed continued in full-time military service in the commando unit of the Israeli Navy Shayetet 13 as a physician, and founded and was appointed Director of the Israel Naval Medical Institute (INMI), which he led for 20 years until he retired in 1995 with the rank of Captain (Navy).

Certification 
Melamed was certified as a Diving Physician by the Israeli and U.S. Navies, and in Aviation Medicine by the Israeli Air Force. He was certified as a professional diver and instructor at Fort Bovisand by the British Sub-Aqua Club in England, and by the "College of Oceaneering" at the Commercial Diving Center, Wilmington, California. He obtained the degree of Specialist in Diving and Hyperbaric Medicine from the Medical School at Chieti University in Italy.

Hyperbaric Medicine in Israel 
As Commanding Officer of the Israel Naval Medical Institute together with Shimon Burshtein, Head of the Intensive Care Unit at Rambam Health Care Campus, he cooperated with the Ministry of Health to extend hyperbaric oxygen treatment (HBOT) to patients with medical indications not related to diving.

In 1982, the Ministry recognized the INMI, in cooperation with Rambam, under Melamed's management, as The National Institute for Diving and Hyperbaric Medicine. Fifteen medical indications for HBOT were officially registered and authorized for the first time in Israel, and in 1994 were included in the ‘basket of services’ under the National Health Law.

Melamed is an active member of professional diving and hyperbaric medicine organizations worldwide and a registered consultant to the Ministry of Health (Israel) on hyperbaric and diving medicine.

Gallery

Prizes and recognition 

 1990: Melamed received the Craig Hoffman Safety Award from the Undersea and Hyperbaric Medical Society (UHMS).
 1993: as head of the INHI, he received the Elkeles Award for the Outstanding Scientist in Medicine.
 1993: he was cited for the "Lifetime Achievement Award" from the Israel Navy.
 1994: he received the Boerema Award from the Undersea and Hyperbaric Medical Society.
 2001: he was nominated Honorary Member of the Neubauer Hyperbaric Neurologic Center, Ocean Drive, Florida.
 2003: he received the Platinum Pro 5000 Instructor Award from Scuba Schools International.

Publications 
Dr. Melamed has published research and clinical articles in scientific medical literature, including over 130 scientific papers and chapters in books.

References

Further reading
 Frank M. Best, Israeli Hyperbaric Unit Treats Civilians Most, U.S. MEDICINE, December 1 1979
 Dror Bloch, Blue white diving, Israeli Diving Federation magasin Jubilee edition, December 2018.

External links
 Professional Profile of Dr Yeuda Melamed Researchgate.
 Yehuda Melamed, Israel Undersea Exploration Society, Haifa, Israel
 Doctor Accuses HMO of Denying Covered Treatments Ran Reznik Haaretz Nov 21, 2008

1943 births
Living people
Israeli male divers
Israeli Jews
Israeli military doctors
Israeli Navy personnel
Tel Aviv University alumni